Garrett Kirk Smithley (born April 27, 1992) is an American professional stock car racing driver. He competes full-time in the NASCAR Xfinity Series, driving the No. 99 Chevrolet Camaro for B. J. McLeod Motorsports, the No. 91 Camaro for DGM Racing and the No. 4 for JD Motorsports. He has also competed in the NASCAR Cup Series, NASCAR Camping World Truck Series, and ARCA Menards Series in the past.

Racing career
Smithley began his racing career in 2007, his sophomore year in high school, in Bandolero cars at Atlanta Motor Speedway and Lanier National Speedway, and won the rookie of the year in 2008. He credits being cast in a school play as a freshman as giving him the confidence needed to race. He moved up to Legends car racing with Peachtree City Golf Carts after having his golf cart stolen and buying a new one there. Smithley credits that relationship as what kept him in racing past Bandoleros, as his family did not have money to advance to Legends. He was chosen to be part of the Richard Petty Driver Search in his first year after high school. 

Growing up, Dale Jarrett and Carl Edwards were two of Smithley's role models. Smithley was attracted to Jarrett at a young age because of his paint scheme, which depicted an American flag.

ARCA Racing Series
Smithley competed in three events in 2013, driving Derrike Cope's cars. His first start, at Pocono Raceway, was Smithley's first stock car race. His one start in 2014 was an 18th at Talladega for Wes Gonder. In 2015, his one start for Rick Ware was hampered by engine problems.

Camping World Truck Series
Smithley made his Truck Series debut at his home track, Atlanta Motor Speedway, driving the No. 63 Chevrolet Silverado for MB Motorsports. He made three more starts in the 2015 season, scoring a high finish of 14th at Michigan. He returned to Atlanta with MB Motorsports for his first start of 2016, finishing 18th.

In March 2019, Smithley returned to the series at Texas Motor Speedway, driving the No. 42 for Chad Finley Racing; the run was part of an effort by Smithley to race in all three NASCAR national series in one weekend. The following year, he signed with Niece Motorsports for the Charlotte Truck event.

Xfinity Series

Smithley made his Xfinity Series debut in the final race of 2015, at Homestead driving the No. 70 Chevrolet Camaro for Derrike Cope Racing, started 34th, and finished 28th.

On February 16, 2016, it was announced that Smithley would race for JD Motorsports, driving the No. 0 Chevrolet Camaro, and would also compete for the NASCAR Rookie of the Year honors. Although the original agreement was only for three races, he ran every race except the PowerShares QQQ 300. Finishing 18th in series points, he finished in the top 15 in both restrictor plate races, including one at Talladega Superspeedway. Smithley cracked the top 20 five times outside of plate tracks, but troubles at road courses (such as running the bus stop at Watkins Glen, resulting in an engine failure) put a slight damper on his season. Another incident at Talladega left Chris Cockrum mad at Smithley; Smithley turned Cockrum off Turn 2, collecting Joey Gase in the process. Cockrum in the infield after the wreck accused Smithley of not knowing how to race at restrictor plate tracks. Smithley, discussing his Wikipedia page in a 2018 podcast, shared his side of the story, claiming Cockrum moved up and there was only "slight contact" that led to the wreck. 

Smithley returned full-time to JD Motorsports in 2017. He ran all the races so far except Chicagoland, where he ran in MBM Motorsports' No. 40 car to make room for Vinnie Miller, who was making his series debut. He scored his first two Xfinity top-10 finishes, at Daytona and Iowa, and led his first Xfinity Series lap at Talladega. The rest of the season didn't go as well in a self-described "sophomore slump". Besides driving, Smithley has also undertaken a publicist-like role within his team, calling companies before races each week to see if they would like to sponsor him. He has opened a personal LLC to help with the finances of sponsorship, mainly taxes. 

On February 7, 2018, Smithley was announced to be returning in the 0 car for the 2018 season. In the season opener, Smithley overcame a spin to score his first NASCAR top five, coming in fifth. He also switched crew chiefs, bringing Wayne Carroll on board. It was then announced two days after the race that Smithley would switch numbers with fellow JD Motorsports driver Matt Mills for the next two races, with Smithley taking Mills' No. 15 and Mills taking Smithley's No. 0. Talking about life at-track in summer 2018, Smithley said that he does not like to make friends with other Xfinity Series regulars, since in previous experiences, making friends had made him less aggressive and more willing to cut other racers' breaks.

Smithley returned to JDM for 2019. For throwback weekend at Darlington Raceway, Smithley drove a tribute paint scheme to MB Motorsports owner Mike Mittler, who died earlier in 2019. Mittler gave Smithley his first opportunity in the NASCAR Camping World Truck Series.

In 2020, Smithley joined SS-Green Light Racing as part of an alliance with Rick Ware Racing, debuting with the team at Charlotte in the No. 07.

On May 24, 2022, Austin Konenski from Sportsnaut revealed that Smithley would drive the No. 36 car for DGM Racing in the race at Charlotte. DGM had announced that Alex Labbé, who had driven the car in every race that year except for the season-opener at Daytona, would not be running that race due to not being able to find a sponsor. Smithley's entry with DGM had an alliance with Rick Ware Racing. Smithley made his second Xfinity Series start of 2022 at Kansas in September in the No. 5 for B. J. McLeod Motorsports after Matt Mills, who was scheduled to drive the car, got the flu earlier in the week.

Cup Series
On June 1, 2018, reports surfaced that Smithley will make his Monster Energy NASCAR Cup Series debut at Michigan with StarCom Racing in the team's No. 99 entry, though the reports were not immediately confirmed by Smithley. Smithley retired from the race after just one lap with a transmission issue. He later ran two other races with Premium Motorsports that season.

In 2019, Smithley picked up a part-time ride with Spire Motorsports to drive the No. 77 Chevrolet starting at Atlanta Motor Speedway. In his limited schedule, Smithley aimed to gain respect from the Cup Series competitors. He cracked the top-30 with a 28th-place finish at the 2019 Brickyard 400. While driving the No. 52 Rick Ware Racing Ford at the 2019 South Point 400 at Las Vegas Motor Speedway, he was heavily criticized by Kyle Busch, who blamed him and Joey Gase for costing him a solid run. 

Smithley returned to RWR for the 2020 NASCAR Cup Series season, racing on an "expanded" schedule beginning with the 2020 Pennzoil 400 at Las Vegas. He also made starts with Spire and B. J. McLeod Motorsports. 

For 2021, Smithley remained with RWR for another part-time schedule in the Cup Series. He also attempted to qualify for the Daytona 500 for the first time in his career. With all four of the Rick Ware cars taken, Smithley drove the No. 13 (previously No. 49) for MBM Motorsports, a team he made one Xfinity Series start for in 2017. Chad Finchum was originally scheduled to drive the car in the race, but he was taken out of it because he had no sponsor lined up while Smithley did have one (Trophy Tractor).

Personal life
Smithley's father and both of his grandfathers were military servicemen. He was born in Pennsylvania, but later moved to Virginia when he was six, and then Georgia in the sixth grade. When he was a child, Smithley played baseball and football, but also was active in dance and chorus, eventually becoming a theater participant at McIntosh High School, even being named as the lead in Charlie and the Chocolate Factory along with being an active member of the Boy Scouts of America. He credits his theater and drama experience as giving him the confidence necessary to take chances in his racing career.

After racing, Smithley hopes to become a television announcer.

Motorsports career results

NASCAR
(key) (Bold – Pole position awarded by qualifying time. Italics – Pole position earned by points standings or practice time. * – Most laps led.)

Cup Series

Daytona 500

Xfinity Series

Camping World Truck Series

 Season still in progress
 Ineligible for series points
 Switched to Xfinity points prior to the spring Charlotte race

ARCA Racing Series
(key) (Bold – Pole position awarded by qualifying time. Italics – Pole position earned by points standings or practice time. * – Most laps led.)

References

External links

 
 

1992 births
Living people
People from Peachtree City, Georgia
Sportspeople from the Atlanta metropolitan area
Racing drivers from Atlanta
Racing drivers from Georgia (U.S. state)
NASCAR drivers
ARCA Menards Series drivers